How to Win! is Maria Bamford's second comedy album, following The Burning Bridges Tour. It was recorded at Cap City Comedy Club in Austin, Texas, on November 15–19, 2005.

Critical reception
Stewart Mason of AllMusic found the album an improvement over her debut record, noting that Bamford seemed to be relying less on a cartoony persona and called her material both "amusingly dark" and "less insular" than previously, "focusing on more social and political topics."

Track listing
"Opening Party" – 2:15
"I Heart My Country" – 3:06
"Mental Makeup" – 2:15
"Competitive Living" – 2:22
"Giant Corporation" – 3:38
"Self Employed" – 3:12
"Saddest Place in the World" – 1:52
"Your Comedy Club" – 1:51
"Fun Being Evil" – 2:28
"Life in LA" – 2:39
"TV" – 2:33
"Super Confident People" – 1:51
"The-Rapist" – 1:15
"Alicia Keys" – 2:42
"Credit Test" – 2:11
"Depression" – 2:14
"Dale Carnegie" – 2:01
"Dad" – 3:18
"Sister Sarah" – 3:02
"Arch Enemy from High School" – 1:31
"Aging" – 1:25

Personnel
Maria Bamford – performer
Britt Lundquist – photography
John Machnik – engineering, mastering, photography
Ian Rans – design
Dan Schlissel – production, editing

References

Maria Bamford albums
Spoken word albums by American artists
Live spoken word albums
2007 live albums
Stand Up! Records live albums
2000s comedy albums